Christina Haller (born 22 March 1968) is a former German curler.

Following retirement, she became the president of Curling Club Schwenningen.

Teams

References

External links
 

Living people
1968 births
German female curlers
European curling champions
German curling champions